The Women's 25 metre pistol pairs event at the 2010 Commonwealth Games took place on 5 October 2010 at the CRPF Campus.

Results

External links
Report

Shooting at the 2010 Commonwealth Games
Common